The National College of Arts (colloquially known as NCA) is a public university located in Lahore, Punjab, Pakistan.

Overview
National College of Arts - A Federal Chartered Institute is the oldest art school in Pakistan and the second oldest in South Asia. As of 2016, the college is ranked as Pakistan's top art school. It consists of over 700 students. The college runs faculty and student exchange programs with School of Fine Arts, University of New South Wales, École nationale supérieure des Beaux-Arts and the Instituto Superior de Arte. It also hosts the UNESCO Chair in architecture.

History

The institute was originally founded in 1876 as Mayo School of Industrial Arts and was one of the two art colleges created by the British crown in British India in reaction to the Arts & Crafts Movement. It was named in honor of the recently assassinated British Viceroy Lord Mayo in 1876. John Lockwood Kipling became the school's first principal who was also appointed as the first curator of the Lahore Museum which opened the same year in an adjacent building. In 1958, the school was renamed as the National College of Arts. Designated the premier art institution in the country, it was transferred to the Ministry of Education from the Ministry Industries in the 1960s. It received a degree-awarding status in 1985 and created its first graduate programs in 1999. In 2011, the college received its own charter and became a degree awarding institute (DAI).

UNDERGRADUATE PROGRAMMES
 Department of Fine Arts
 Department of Design
 Visual Communication Design
 Ceramics Design
 Industrial Design
 Textile Design
 Department of Film and Television
 Department of Architecture
 Department of Musicology
 Department of Cultural Studies

GRADUATE PROGRAMMES
 Master of Visual Art
 Master of Interior Design
 Master of Multimedia Art
 Mphil in Cultural Studies

Notable alumni
 Murtaza Jafri - Painter and Sculptor
 Muhammad Zeeshan - Artist and Curator
 Salima Hashmi - Artist and Educator
 Shahzia Sikander - Artist
 Faisal Qureshi - Actor and humorist
 Ammar Aziz - Filmmaker and poet
 Anila Quayyum Agha - Artist
 Satish Gujral - Artist
 Affan Waheed - Artist/Actor
 Bhai Ram Singh - Architect

Rawalpindi sub campus
The college established its second campus in Rawalpindi in 2005.

References

External links 
 NCA official website

 
Universities and colleges in Lahore
Educational institutions established in 1875
Art schools in Pakistan
Pakistani art
1875 establishments in British India
Film schools in Pakistan
The Mall, Lahore
Public universities and colleges in Punjab, Pakistan